HMS Grafton was one of a dozen Blackwood-class frigate (also known as the Type 14 class) of second-rate anti-submarine frigates built for the Royal Navy in the 1950s.

Description
The ships were powered by one English Electric geared steam turbine that drove the single propeller shaft, using steam provided by two Babcock & Wilcox boilers. Their complement was 140 officers and ratings.

The ships were armed with three Bofors 40 mm guns in single mounts. The mount on the quarterdeck was later removed as it was unusable in heavy seas. They were equipped with two triple-barrelled Limbo Mark 10 anti-submarine mortars. The Blackwood-class ships had the same sonar suite as the larger s where the Limbo mortars were controlled by three sonars, the Type 174 search set, Type 162 target-classification set and the Type 170 'pencil beam' targeting set to determine the bearing and depth of the target.

Construction and career
Grafton was launched by Lady Grantham, wife of Admiral Sir Guy Grantham, who was Commander-in-Chief Portsmouth. She was first commissioned in January 1957, serving with the 2nd Frigate Squadron based at Portland Harbour until March 1963, when the ship started a refit at Portsmouth Dockyard. Following this refit, Grafton joined the 20th Frigate Squadron based at Londonderry Port in Northern Ireland, being based there until April 1969, when she was paid off.

She attended Portsmouth Navy Days in 1967 and again in 1968. Grafton was broken up at Inverkeithing from December 1971.

Notes

Bibliography
 
 
 
 
 

 

Blackwood-class frigates
1954 ships